The Asian Men's U23 Volleyball Championship is an international volleyball competition in Asia and Oceania contested by the under 23 men's national teams of the members of Asian Volleyball Confederation (AVC), the sport's continent governing body. Tournaments have been awarded every two years since 2015.

The current champion is Chinese Taipei, which won its first title at the 2019 tournament.

The 2019 Asian Championship took place in Naypyidaw, Myanmar.

Results summary

Teams reaching the top four

Champions by region

Hosts

Medal summary

Participating nations

Debut of teams

Awards

See also

 Asian Women's U23 Volleyball Championship
 Asian Men's Volleyball Championship
 Asian Men's U20 Volleyball Championship
 Asian Boys' U18 Volleyball Championship

External links
 Official AVC website

U23

V
International volleyball competitions
International men's volleyball competitions
Youth volleyball
Volleyball competitions in Asia
Biennial sporting events
Asian Volleyball Confederation competitions
Asian youth sports competitions